Alicia Scott may refer to:

 Alicia Ann, Lady John Scott, Scottish songwriter
 Alicia Scott, pseudonym of American author Lisa Gardner